Erik Anders Sixten Grönros (born 19 October 1953), is a Swedish film director. He was awarded the Guldbagge Award for Best Director at the 27th Guldbagge Awards, for the film Agnes Cecilia – en sällsam historia. In 2007, his documentary Ambres – en död talar, which dealt with the medium Sture Johansson, and the spirit called Ambres, was broadcast on SVT2. The medium are claiming that it speaks through him.

Filmography 
 1979 – Den åttonde dagen (director, writer)
 1991 – Agnes Cecilia – en sällsam historia (director, writer)
 1998 – Glasblåsarns barn (director, writer)
 2007 – Ambres – en död talar (director, writer)
 2011 – Jag saknar dig (director, writer)

Radio 
In 2005, Anders Grönros dramatised and directed a radio play version of Agnes Cecilia.

References

External links 

1953 births
Living people
Swedish film directors
Best Director Guldbagge Award winners
Place of birth missing (living people)